The Belarusian Congress of Democratic Trade Unions is a confederation and center of trade unions in Belarus. It has 15,000 members in 4 affiliated unions and its headquarters are located in Minsk.

Affiliates

The following trade unions are currently affiliated to BKDP:

History

BKDP was founded in 1993.

In September 2020, during the 2020–2021 Belarusian protests, the Belarusian government arrested workers striking at Belaruskali. Some of the workers were members of BKDP affiliate Belarusian Independent Trade Union, including its vice-president.

On April 7, 2022, the KGB declared the BKDP affiliate Belarusian Radio-Electrical Manufacturing Workers' Trade Union to be an extremist organisation. This was the first time that Belarusian authorities had designated a registered trade union as extremist. On April 19, law enforcement agencies raided the offices of BKDP and several affiliate unions. They confiscated computers, paperwork and union flags. BKDP president Aliaksandr Yarashuk, vice-president Siarhei Antusevich and other officials from BKDP and affiliated unions were also arrested. The European Trade Union Confederation and the International Labour Organization condemned the arrests of the officials and demanded they be set free.

References

International Trade Union Confederation
National trade union centers of Belarus